Webby may refer to:

People 
Chris Webby (born 1988), American rapper
Elizabeth Webby, Australian academic scholar
Kirk Webby (born 1970), New Zealand equestrian
William Neill (rugby league) (1884–1964), Australian rugby league footballer

Other uses 
Webby Award, an Internet award
Webbigail "Webby" Vanderquack, a character in DuckTales

See also 
Webbie (born 1985), American rapper